Hayden-McNeil Publishing is a privately held company and subsidiary of Macmillan Learning headquartered in Plymouth, MI, and a publisher of college and university level custom educational materials in the United States.

History

Founded by Patrick Olson in 1992, Hayden-McNeil Publishing is located in Plymouth, MI, and is a subsidiary of Macmillan Publishers. Macmillan Publishers acquired Hayden-McNeil Publishing in 2008, providing for future growth through access to Macmillan's content, educational technology, and distribution assets.

Custom Textbooks

Hayden-McNeil pairs managing editors with authors to create course-specific custom textbooks. Authors can publish a textbook in any academic discipline for higher education courses.

Expanded Custom Program

In May 2015, Hayden-McNeil Publishing announced the expansion of their custom publishing service to courses with enrollment as low as 200.

Lab Notebooks

Hayden-McNeil's carbonless lab notebooks come in twelve science disciplines. The white carbonless paper creates duplicate sets of all laboratory notes.

References

Academic publishing companies
Book publishing companies of the United States
Educational publishing companies of the United States
Companies based in Wayne County, Michigan
Holtzbrinck Publishing Group